Atsinganosaurus is a genus of titanosaurian sauropod dinosaur which existed in what is now France during the late Cretaceous period. Well-preserved remains (and the only known) of Atsinganosaurus were collected from the Grès à Reptiles Formation of the Aix-en-Provence Basin. Atsinganosaurus was first described by Géraldine Garcia, Sauveur Amico, Francois Fournier, Eudes Thouand and Xavier Valentin in 2010, and the type and only species is Atsinganosaurus velauciensis.

The generic name is derived from the Greek word "τσιγγάνος" or "αθίγγανος", both meaning "gypsy", which refers to the possible migration from east to west of the species. The specific name is named after its finding place, Velaux - La Bastide Neuve.

A 2018 cladistic analysis of Titanosauria places Ampelosaurus, Atsinganosaurus, and Lirainosaurus in the new lithostrotian clade Lirainosaurinae.

References 

Titanosaurs
Maastrichtian life
Late Cretaceous dinosaurs of Europe
Cretaceous France
Fossils of France
Fossil taxa described in 2010